An M-sequence may refer to:
Regular sequence, which is an important topic in commutative algebra.
A maximum length sequence, which is a type of pseudorandom binary sequence.